Richibucto-Village (often spelt Richibouctou-Village) is a settlement in Kent County, New Brunswick on Route 505. Amelie Allain is the mayor of the village

History
 L’homme le plus vieux connu du village est Léo-Paul a bébé

Notable people

See also
List of communities in New Brunswick
Rexton, New Brunswick
Richibucto, New Brunswick
Bonar Law

References

Communities in Kent County, New Brunswick
Settlements in New Brunswick